TPO may refer to:

Arts
Taipei Philharmonic Orchestra
Thailand Philharmonic Orchestra
Tin Pot Operation, an indie-punk band from Belfast, Northern Ireland
Tokyo Philharmonic Orchestra

Biology and medicine
the temporo-parieto-occipital junction of the brain
thyroid peroxidase (or thyroperoxidase), an enzyme in the thyroid
thrombopoietin, a hormone stimulating platelet growth

Government
Transportation Planning Organization, United States

Law
Temporary protective order, a court order banning someone from going near a third party that they have allegedly harassed, in Ireland or the United States
a tree preservation order in the United Kingdom

Science and technology
Thermoplastic olefin, a plastic polymer/filler blend
Transmitter power output in radio transmission

Other
 The People's Operator, a mobile virtual network operator in the United Kingdom
 Third-party ownership in association football
 A transit patrol officer of Victoria Transit Patrol, Australia
 Travelling Post Offices, mail trains in Great Britain
 Treatment plant operator, an operator of water and waste water treatment plants
 Triple peel on opponent manoeuvre in croquet